The Joo Koon rail accident, or sometimes referred to as the Joo Koon train collision, was an accident which happened on 15 November 2017, when a C151A train travelling at  rear-ended a stationary C151A train at Joo Koon station on the East West MRT line, resulting in 38 injuries. The stationary train was in the process of being detrained due to a train fault. Both trains were operating under the recently installed Thales SelTrac CBTC signalling system at time of incident, and the Minister of Transport Khaw Boon Wan expressed that he was "disturbed" by an initial finding that "critical safety software" was inadvertently removed from the stationary train, possibly due to a malfunctioning signalling circuit, which led to the accident. This incident is the second train collision in Singapore MRT's history, after the Clementi rail accident.

Background
The East West MRT Line, at the time of the incident, was in the transition process between the older Westinghouse ATC fixed block signalling and the newer Thales Group SelTrac CBTC moving block signalling. Both systems are in use on the same line, but only the newer CBTC signalling equipment was available for the Tuas West Extension between Joo Koon and Tuas Link. As a result, trains are required to switch from the Westinghouse signalling to the Thales signalling at Pioneer prior to heading towards Tuas Link, and vice versa in the other direction.

There were previous high-profile train disruptions in June 2017 during the testing phase on the North South MRT line, when it was transitioning to the Thales SelTrac CBTC. Those incidents were found to be a result of human error when new software was being installed. Before this accident, SMRT had originally scheduled full-line testing of Thales CBTC to begin on the East West Line in December 2017.

Incident
The first train, a Kawasaki-Sifang C151A bound for Tuas Link, had to be removed from service due to a train fault at 8.18am caused by a separate signalling fault. The second train, another C151A, bound for the same terminus, stopped behind the first train while the automatic platform gate was manually overridden to allow the detrainment of the first train. The second train had 517 passengers on board. As the doors of the first train were closed, the second train suddenly accelerated to a speed of 16 km/h and rear-ended the first train. Witnesses outside the train reported hearing a loud bang. This resulted in 38 injuries, including two SMRT Trains staff members. Many of the injuries resulted from passengers losing balance and impacting the floor or fixtures, and ranged from vomiting to a broken tooth. The injured passengers and staff were treated at National University Hospital and Ng Teng Fong General Hospital.

Response and investigation

Reactions
The accident increased public anger and pressure on both SMRT Corporation and Land Transport Authority (LTA), in light of a major tunnel flooding incident weeks prior, which resulted in a discovery that SMRT maintenance workers had failed to perform the necessary maintenance work on its pumps and had falsified records. Both organizations described the accident as one train "coming into contact" with another train in their initial media releases, and this was criticized by commentators and the public as an attempt to downplay the incident. A later statement by the LTA changed it to a collision.

Opposition parties have responded to the incident as well. Singapore Democratic Party called for transport minister Khaw Boon Wan to resign, while the Workers Party asked for the authorities to launch an investigation. Prime Minister of Singapore Lee Hsien Loong admitted that both the tunnel flooding and the Joo Koon accident has "hurt public confidence a lot". Despite that, PM Lee has insisted that Singapore's public transport remains "first class".

Transport minister Khaw initially apologized to the commuters involved. Later, Khaw expressed that he was "disturbed" by an initial finding that "critical safety software" was inadvertently removed from the stationary train, possibly due to a malfunctioning signalling circuit, which led to the accident.

Investigation
A preliminary investigation held jointly between SMRT Trains, Land Transport Authority, and Thales found that the first train had a safety protection feature removed when it went over a faulty signalling circuit. That safety protection feature was designed to fix a known bug which wrongly designated the six-car train as a three-car train under certain degraded modes, such as when the two onboard computers in the train's Thales CBTC system are unable to communicate with each other.

While the first train was being detrained and the automatic platform doors were opened, a separate protection module was activated to block off the entire length of the platform at Joo Koon station. The module notified the second train's signalling computer that the Joo Koon station's westbound platform was occupied and to stay clear of the platform. The second train stopped at the correct distance behind the first train while the automatic platform doors were open. However, once the doors were closed, the platform length protection module was removed. When the signalling on the second train detected the first train as only three cars instead of six, it started moving to close the perceived gap between both trains for the distance of three cars, thus allowing the acceleration of the second train and the rear-end collision with the first train. SMRT later explained that when the first train was detraining at the platform, a signal was given off to show that the platform was occupied. However, when the platform screen doors closed, the protection was then removed, allowing the second train to hit the first.

Aftermath

Temporary suspension of service
Following the incident, SMRT announced that services on the Tuas West Extension (TWE) would be suspended on 16 November 2017 for safety checks on the signalling system. This was then extended to 20 November 2017, when SMRT announced that the TWE would reopen but operate separately from the rest of the line for at least a month. Eastbound trains from Tuas Link would terminate at Gul Circle, while westbound trains from Pasir Ris would terminate at Joo Koon, allowing the two different signalling systems to be isolated until a solution was found. Service between Gul Circle and Joo Koon was suspended on that date and free bus bridging services became available. On 21 November 2017, in a media statement made by Transport Minister Khaw, SMRT and LTA announced that services between Gul Circle and Joo Koon would be further suspended until mid-2018, when signalling upgrades on the remainder of the line are expected to be completed, to prevent another collision in the future. Services between Gul Circle and Joo Koon resumed on 28 May 2018 after the entire EWL transitioned to the CBTC signalling system.

Early closure on NSEWL
Following the investigation, SMRT announced that operation hours on the NSEWL would be reduced to facilitate more maintenance works and the complete transition to the CBTC signalling system. Starting from 8 December 2017 to 31 December 2017, 17 stations on the East West line from Tiong Bahru to Tuas Link and 2 stations on the North South line from Bukit Batok to Bukit Gombak will close early at 11pm on Fridays and Saturdays, while the opening will be delayed to 8 am on Saturdays and Sundays, and stations were closed throughout the day on Sundays (10 & 17 December 2017). A second round of closures planned for January 2018 would affect the line from Paya Lebar to Pasir Ris and Changi Airport.
In the final round of closures, all stations on the East West line would close earlier at 11pm on Fridays and Saturdays and open later on Saturdays and Sundays throughout the month, with two days having even earlier closing times. This was to facilitate for additional maintenance works along the line as it switches over to the new CBTC signalling system.

Subsequent maintenance works
Since the incident, it was announced on 1 January 2018 that sections of NSEWL were to conduct facilitation of maintenance works with stations closing earlier and opening later on weekends starting with the East-West Line stretch, with the exception of weekends with public holidays. Thereafter, sections of NSEWL were to do the same in a month or two to mitigate such incidents.

See also
 Shanghai Metro Line 10 Rail Accident, 2011 collision between two trains involving CBTC signalling during testing phase resulting in 271 injuries
 Pasir Ris rail accident, a fatal accident where a train struck track maintenance workers
 Tsuen Wan line accident, a non-fatal accident involving CBTC testing by MTR Corporation

References

2017 in Singapore
Accidents and incidents involving Mass Rapid Transit (Singapore)
November 2017 events in Asia
Railway accidents in 2017
Rail accidents and incidents in Singapore
2017 disasters in Singapore